The Sheer Islands are Canadian arctic islands that are located in Qikiqtaaluk Region, Nunavut, Canada. They are a Baffin Island offshore island group in Hudson Strait.

The group consists of:
 Forder Island, at the northern entrance to Itivirk Bay
 Lee Island, northeast of Forder Island and joined to it at low tide
 Lavoie Island, in the northeast
 Wishart Island, in the northeast.

References

Archipelagoes of Baffin Island
Archipelagoes of the Canadian Arctic Archipelago
Islands of Hudson Strait
Uninhabited islands of Qikiqtaaluk Region